"Kissed by Fire" is the fifth episode of the third season of HBO's fantasy television series Game of Thrones, and the 25th episode of the series. Directed by Alex Graves and written by Bryan Cogman, it aired on April 28, 2013.

The title of the episode refers to the red-haired Wildlings, like Ygritte, who are said to be "kissed by fire". Fire is also a key element in other storylines, with Sandor Clegane's fear of fire being shown, as well as the Mad King's obsession with Wildfire, as told by Jaime Lannister.

The episode won the Primetime Emmy Award for Outstanding Make-up for a Single-Camera Series (Non-Prosthetic) at the 65th Primetime Creative Arts Emmy Awards.

Plot

At Dragonstone
Stannis is surprised when his wife, Queen Selyse, encourages his infidelity as service to the Lord of Light. His daughter, Princess Shireen, visits Davos in the dungeons with a book; he admits he is illiterate, and she begins teaching him to read.

In the Riverlands
In trial by combat, the Hound is offput by Beric's flaming sword, but overcomes his pyrophobia and kills Beric. Gendry stops Arya from attacking the Hound, and  Beric is resurrected for a sixth time by Thoros, who then frees the Hound. Later, Gendry tells Arya he intends to stay with the Brotherhood as a smith. Arya talks with Thoros about taking her to Riverrun to claim a reward from Robb Stark.

At Riverrun
Captives Martyn and Willem Lannister are murdered by Lord Karstark and his men. Despite Talisa, Catelyn, and Edmure entreating Robb to hold Karstark prisoner, he personally executes Karstark. Soon, the Karstark forces abandon the Northern army, and Robb tells Talisa his new plan to attack Casterly Rock, the Lannister ancestral home, and forge an alliance for troops with Lord Frey, whose daughter he was to marry.

At Harrenhal
Locke delivers Jaime and Brienne to Lord Roose Bolton, who frees Brienne and sends Jaime to Qyburn, a former maester who was thrown out of the Citadel for human experimentation, treats Jaime's amputation. At the baths, Jaime tells Brienne of Robert's Rebellion, and the "Mad King" Aerys Targaryen's plot to burn King's Landing with caches of wildfire. Jaime reveals that he killed the Mad King and broke his oath to save the city, its people, and his own father after the King ordered him to bring him his fathers head. Brienne asks why he didn’t tell Eddard Stark the truth but Jaime believes he didn’t have to explain himself.

Beyond the Wall
Jon reveals which forts are manned but lies to Orell and Tormund that a thousand men are stationed at Castle Black. Ygritte steals Jon's sword and he chases her into a cave, where she has him break his Night's Watch vows and make love with her.

In Slaver's Bay
Daenerys’s Unsullied officers select Grey Worm as their leader. On the march, Jorah probes Barristan's motives for joining Daenerys, but he appears unaware Jorah was originally a spy for Varys under King Robert.

In King's Landing
Cersei asks for Baelish's assistance in ridding King's Landing of the Tyrells. Loras’ squire and new lover Olyvar reports to Baelish the Tyrells' plan to marry Sansa. Baelish meets with Sansa to discuss their journey to the Vale, but she decides to stay in King's Landing. Later, Tywin tells Tyrion and Cersei his plan to ruin the Tyrell's plot by wedding Tyrion to Sansa and Cersei to Loras, tersely overruling their objections.

Production

Writing

"Kissed by Fire" is the third episode in the series written by the co-producer and executive story editor Bryan Cogman, after the first season's "Cripples, Bastards, and Broken Things" and the second's "What Is Dead May Never Die". Cogman is the member of the writing team entrusted with keeping the show's bible and mapping the story arcs with those of the original books for each season.

The sections of George R. R. Martin's novel A Storm of Swords adapted in the episode include parts from chapters 20, 21, 27, 32, 35, 38 and 40 (Tyrion III, Catelyn III, Jon III, Jaime IV, Arya VI, Jaime V, and Arya VII).

The scenes with Stannis' wife and daughter were written to present the characters, whose introduction had been delayed in the show since the beginning of season 2. The idea of Queen Selyse conserving the fetuses of her stillborn sons in glass, absent in the original novels, was a notion that Cogman came up with while writing the episode.

Cogman enjoyed that the episode he was assigned to write included several fan-favorite scenes, and involved a lot of material with the child actors: "The kids are always my favorite characters to write... Maybe it’s because I’m so fond of the actors who play them, and I’ve watched them grow up for the past four years." He wrote all the Arya scenes before starting with the other storylines.

Initially the episode did not include any scene with Daenerys, but early in pre-production some scenes originally written by David Benioff and D. B. Weiss for the next episode were moved into the script. The confrontation between Jon Snow and Orell was written and included by Benioff and Weiss later during production.

Casting
The episode introduces Stannis's family with actresses Tara Fitzgerald and Kerry Ingram as queen Selyse Baratheon and princess Shireen Baratheon, respectively. Selyse had briefly appeared in the first season 2 episode during the burning of the gods at the Dragonstone beach, played by an uncredited extra. Jacob Anderson also debuts playing Grey Worm, the commander of the Unsullied.

Filming locations

Most of the episode was shot in the sets built in The Paint Hall studios in Belfast. Also in Northern Ireland, the Pollnagollum cave in Belmore Forest was used to film parts of the hideout of the Brotherhood, and the gardens of Gosford Castle served as the Riverrun exteriors where Lord Karstark was beheaded.

The scenes with Daenerys were filmed in Morocco, and the ones with Jon in Iceland. The Wildlings camp was built by the shores of lake Mývatn, with its distinctive vertical lava formations clearly seen. The nearby grotto where Jon and Ygritte have sex is cave Grjótagjá; however, the cave was used mainly for establishing shot of Jon Snow and Ygritte in the cave, and most of this scene was filmed in the studio. The thermal water pool of the cave is actually used for bathing and is a popular tourist attraction.

Finally, two Croatian exteriors appear in the episode: the conversation between Cersei and Littlefinger takes place at the inner terrace of Fort Lovrijenac, and Littlefinger's later visit to Sansa was filmed at the Trsteno Arboretum.

Reception

Ratings
"Kissed by Fire" set a new ratings record for the series, with 5.35 million viewers for its first airing and a 2.8 share of adults aged 18 to 49. In the United Kingdom, the episode was seen by 0.959 million viewers on Sky Atlantic, being the channel's second highest-rated broadcast that week.

Critical reception
"Kissed by Fire" received positive critical reviews after airing, with particular praise going to Nikolaj Coster-Waldau for his performance. Review aggregator Rotten Tomatoes surveyed 21 reviews of the episode and judged 100% of them to be positive with an average score of 8.8 out of 10. The website's critical consensus reads, "Despite lacking the big action reveals of the previous episode, 'Kissed by Fire' is anchored by a devastatingly intimate scene between Brienne and Jaime, and plenty of Lannister intrigue." IGN's Matt Fowler gave "Kissed by Fire" a 9.5/10, his highest rating of the season, writing "No dragons this week, but Game of Thrones still gave us some of its best material ever." Reviewing for The A.V. Club, David Sims gave the episode an "A−", commenting on how despite the lack of shocking moments like those of the last episode, the show delivers quality in its slower, dialogue-driven scenes. Emily VanDerWerff of The A.V. Club gave the episode a "B+". Sean T. Collins of the Rolling Stone magazine also gave an overwhelmingly positive review, calling it a "nearly flawless" episode, praising especially Maisie Williams' acting in the scenes with Arya and the Brotherhood.

Accolades

References

External links 

 "Kissed by Fire" at HBO.com
 

2013 American television episodes
Game of Thrones (season 3) episodes